The Adoption of Ala'a Eddeen is an adoption of a then 9-year-old Iraqi boy, who could not walk because he suffered from cerebral palsy, by American Capt. Scott Southworth while he was deployed during the Iraq War.

This case became a beginning of the growing campaign for bringing more disabled and orphaned Iraqi children to the United States.

In 2007, CNN profiled Scott and Ala'a's story in its "Heroes: An All-Star Tribute". The story was chosen as one of 6 finalists.

Scott Southworth 
Before his deployment to Iraq Scott Southworth did not own a home, was unmarried, worked long hours, and "squeezed in his service as a national guardsman". Scott's family considered it to be an honor to serve in the military. He continued the tradition set up by the three generations of his predecessors: his great-great-great grandfather, his grandfather and his father. An evangelical Christian Scott finished law school, and planned to run for district attorney's office after coming home from Iraq.

Meeting and adoption 
Scott Southworth was deployed to Iraq in 2003. His deployment was to last 13 months. On September 6, 2003, half-way into his deployment Capt. Southworth with his unit visited an orphanage named for Mother Teresa. There were 20 children in the orphanage, all with physical disabilities. A few nuns cared for the children and also taught them to speak some English.

During their visit to the orphanage the soldiers played with the children. They wanted to make the kids feel better, but it was also their way to forget the horror they faced every day on the streets of Baghdad: twenty soldiers of this unit were wounded, and one was killed. It was then that Scott first saw Ala'a. The boy, who lived in the orphanage since he was 4 years old, could not walk, but he dragged himself to Scott's side. The boy's English was limited, but he kept saying the word "bomb". Scott tried to assure the boy he was safe now.

After the first visit to the orphanage soldiers kept coming back. The attachment between Southworth and Ala'a was growing. Thirty-one-year-old Scott looked at Ala'a as a younger brother, but for the boy Scott was "Baba," that is "Daddy" in Arabic.

Southworth was informed by staff of the orphanage that within a year Ala'a would be transferred to a less hospitable institution prompting Scott to begin adoption proceedings.

Iraqi law prohibits the adoption of Iraqi children by foreigners, but after returning home, Southworth was able to secure a humanitarian visa for the boy. By that time Southworth had been elected district attorney, and his income became steady. Southworth is grateful for the individuals and organizations that helped him to bring Ala'a to United States: "We crossed political boundaries. We crossed religious boundaries. There was just a massive effort — all on behalf of this little boy who desperately needed people to actually take some action and not just feel sorry for him." Since Jan. 20, 2005 Ala'a and Scott have been living together. The boy's health has improved significantly, he's attending a school, enjoys math, likes reading, but weeps during thunderstorms that remind him of bombs.

When Southworth is asked why he chose Ala'a, he explains that it was Ala'a who chose him. "Ala'a really adopted me." - Scott says.

In 2007 CNN profiled Southworth and Ala'a's story in its "Heroes: An All-Star Tribute". The story was chosen as one of 18 finalists. The money collected from the show was used to pay medical and legal bills for Ala'a. The pair have been the focus of a variety of media, including an article in the VFW Magazine, a full episode on PBS, and a presentation at St. Norbert College.

Southworth asked Lt. Gov. Barbara Lawton for help in bringing other disabled and orphaned children to the US.

By 2009, 16-year-old Ala'a had become a United States citizen.

Southworth says:

Being upset just isn't enough. Sympathy just isn't enough. These kids need action, and we're in a position where we know these children, we know what can happen here in the United States if they're brought here, and we're going to do something about it.

References

External links 
 Operation Rescue Ala'a
 The Orphan He Couldn’t Leave Behind
 Iraqi Orphan Adoption

Adoptees
Iraq War and the media
Living people
Year of birth missing (living people)